Urophora neuenschwanderi is a species of tephritid or fruit flies in the genus Urophora of the family Tephritidae.

Distribution
Greece.

References

Urophora
Insects described in 1982
Diptera of Europe